Heidemarie Steiner married Walther, (born 9 May 1944 in Kolberg, Province of Pomerania) is a German figure skating coach and former competitor. She competed in pair skating and ladies singles.

Steiner began as a single skater. But when she dropped behind fellow East German Gabriele Seyfert, she wanted to retire early.

However, she changed to pair skating and teamed up with Heinz-Ulrich Walther, who also became her husband in 1969. Their greatest success was winning the bronze medal at the 1970 World Championships in Ljubljana. The pair trained at the SC Dynamo Berlin club and represented East Germany. Their coach was Heinz-Friedrich Lindner.

After she retired, she became figure skating coach at the SC Dynamo Berlin club (today SC Berlin). She has coached Romy Kermer & Rolf Österreich, Birgit Lorenz & Knut Schubert, Babette Preußler & Tobias Schöter and Peggy Schwarz & Alexander König, among others. She later coached Swiss couple Leslie Monod & Cedric Monod. She also worked as a choreographer for this couple.

Today she lives in Berlin with her husband Heinz-Ulrich Walther.

Results

Ladies' singles

Pairs with Walther

See also 
SV Dynamo

External links

https://web.archive.org/web/20060502042510/http://www.eklscberlin.arcgraph.de/

1944 births
Living people
People from Kołobrzeg
People from the Province of Pomerania
Sportspeople from West Pomeranian Voivodeship
German female pair skaters
German female single skaters
Figure skaters at the 1968 Winter Olympics
Olympic figure skaters of East Germany
German figure skating coaches
World Figure Skating Championships medalists
European Figure Skating Championships medalists
Female sports coaches
Recipients of the Patriotic Order of Merit in bronze